Onondaga County Public Libraries (OCPL) is a consolidated county library system with more than 30 branches in Onondaga County. Its headquarters are in Syracuse, New York. It was established in 1976 as a result of the merger of the Onondaga Library System and Syracuse Public library.

Branch locations

City libraries 

 Central Library
 Beauchamp Branch Library
 Betts Branch Library
 Hazard Branch Library
 Mundy Branch Library
 Northeast Community Center Library
 Paine Branch Library
 Petit Branch Library
 Soule Branch Library
 Southwest Community Center Library
 White Branch Library

Suburban libraries 

 Baldwinsville Public Library
 Brewerton NOPL
 Cicero NOPL
 Community Library of DeWitt & Jamesville
 East Syracuse Free Library
 Elbridge Free Library
 Fairmount Community Library
 Fayetteville Free Library
 Jordan Bramley Library
 LaFayette Public Library
 Liverpool Public Library
 Manlius Library
 Marcellus Free Library
 Maxwell Memorial Library
 Minoa Library
 North Syracuse NOPL
 Onondaga Free Library
 Salina Library
 Skaneateles Library
 Solvay Public Library
 Tully Free Library

References

Education in Onondaga County, New York
County library systems in New York (state)